The Pensacola Senators (also the Dons and Angels) were a Minor League Baseball team, based in Pensacola, Florida, United States, that operated in the Alabama–Florida League between 1957 and 1962.

External links
Pensacola, Florida baseball reference

Defunct Alabama-Florida League teams
Chicago White Sox minor league affiliates
Baltimore Orioles minor league affiliates
Washington Senators minor league affiliates
Pensacola metropolitan area
Defunct baseball teams in Florida
Sports in Pensacola, Florida
1957 establishments in Florida
1962 disestablishments in Florida
Baseball teams established in 1957
Baseball teams disestablished in 1962